Clifton "Clif" Moore (born February 15, 1949) is a Democratic member of the West Virginia House of Delegates, representing the 23rd District since 2004. He currently serves as Assistant Majority Whip.

External links
West Virginia Legislature - Delegate Clif Moore official government website
Project Vote Smart - Representative Clif Moore (WV) profile
Follow the Money - Clif Moore
2008 2006 2004 campaign contributions

Democratic Party members of the West Virginia House of Delegates
1949 births
Living people
People from McDowell County, West Virginia
21st-century American politicians